Lenny Faustino (born May 29, 1979) is a Canadian former pair skater. With Jacinthe Larivière, 2003 Canadian national champion and represented Canada at the 2002 Salt Lake City Olympic Games. They were coached by Lee Barkell in Barrie, Ontario.

Faustino retired from competition in 2004. He is a graduate of York University with a Bachelor of Commerce, Marketing Honours and also holds a Diploma from Georgian College in Business - Marketing. In 2005, he married Jennifer Ruppel, with whom he has two children. He lives in Toronto and holds the designations of Certified Financial Planner (CFP) and a Chartered Life Underwiter (CLU) and is a team member with Trudy Butt & Associates Private Wealth Management.

Programs 
(with Larivière)

Results

With Larivière

With Wade

References

External links
 

1979 births
Canadian male pair skaters
Olympic figure skaters of Canada
Figure skaters at the 2002 Winter Olympics
Living people
Figure skaters from Toronto